An entrepôt or transshipment port is a port, city, or trading post where merchandise may be imported, stored, or traded, usually to be exported again. Such cities often sprang up and such ports and trading posts often developed into commercial cities due to the growth and expansion of long-distance trade. These places played a critical role in trade during the days of wind-powered shipping. In modern times customs areas have largely made entrepôts obsolete, but the term is still used to refer to duty-free ports with a high volume of re-export trade. Entrepôt also means 'warehouse' in modern French, and is derived from the Latin roots  'between' +  'position', literally 'that which is placed between.'

Entrepôts had an important role in the early modern period, when mercantile shipping flourished between Europe and its colonial empires in the Americas and Asia. For example, the spice trade to Europe, which necessitated long trade routes, led to a much higher market price than the original buying price. Traders often did not want to travel the whole route, and thus used the entrepôts on the way to sell their goods. This could conceivably lead to more attractive profits for those who were suited to traveling the entire route. The 17th-century Amsterdam Entrepôt is an excellent early modern example.

Examples

Examples of specific entrepôts at various periods include:

Africa
 Alexandria, Ptolemaic Egypt
 Boma, Democratic Republic of the Congo
 Cap-Vert, Senegal
 Cape of Good Hope, South Africa
 Djibouti City, Djibouti
 Port Said, Egypt
 Suez, Egypt
 Tangier, Morocco
 Tin Can Island Port, Nigeria
 Zanzibar

Americas
 Baltimore, Maryland, US
 Castries, St. Lucia
 Colón, Panama
 Fort Orange, (New Netherland), Albany, New York, US
 New Orleans, Louisiana, US
 Saint Paul, Minnesota, US
 Rio de Janeiro, Rio de Janeiro, Brazil
 São Paulo, São Paulo, Brazil
 Curitiba, Paraná, Brazil

Asia
 Aden, Yemen
 Balikpapan, Indonesia
 Basra, Iraq
 Batavia, Dutch East Indies / Jakarta, modern-day Indonesia
 Beirut, Ottoman Empire, modern-day Lebanon
 Busan, South Korea
 Dubai, UAE
 Chonburi, Thailand
 Hong Kong
 Jeddah, Saudi Arabia
 Macao
 Makassar, Indonesia
 Malacca, Malacca Sultanate and Portuguese Malacca, modern-day Malaysia
 Manila, Philippines
 Naha, Ryūkyū Kingdom, modern-day Japan
 Osaka, Japan
 Palembang, Srivijaya, modern-day Indonesia
 Port of Keelung, Taiwan
 Port of Kaohsiung, Taiwan
 Port Klang, Malaysia
 Kollam/Quilon, India
 Salalah, Oman
 Shanghai, China
 Singapore
 Tianjin, China
 Tokyo, Japan
 Surabaya, Indonesia
 Bangkok, Thailand
 Weihaiwei, China

Europe
 Amsterdam, Netherlands
 Barcelona, Spain
 Cádiz, Spain
 Constantinople / Istanbul, modern-day Turkey
 Copenhagen, Denmark
 Gioia Tauro, Italy
 Guernsey, England
 Hamburg, Germany
 Lisbon, Portugal
 Liverpool, United Kingdom
 London, United Kingdom
 Marseille, France
 Piraeus, Athens, Greece
 Rotterdam, Netherlands
 Saint Petersburg, Russia
 Venice, Italy

Oceania
 Honolulu, Hawaii
 Melbourne, Australia

See also

 Factory (trading post)
 Free port
 Re-exportation

References

Trade